NGC 83 is an elliptical galaxy estimated to be about 260 million light-years away in the constellation of Andromeda. It was discovered by John Herschel in 1828 and its apparent magnitude is 14.2.

References

External links
 

0083
Elliptical galaxies
Andromeda (constellation)
18280817
Discoveries by John Herschel